This list of British architecture firms includes notable architecture practices (or companies known for their architectural output) founded and/or headquartered in the United Kingdom.

A–M

ABK, founded 1961
AL_A, founded 2009
Allies and Morrison, founded 1984
Archigram, architectural collective active c. 1962–1964
Architects Co-Partnership founded 1939
Arup, founded 1946
Ash Sakula Architects, founded 1996
Assael Architecture, founded 1994
Bennetts Associates, founded 1987
Benoy, founded 1947
Benson & Forsyth
H. E. and A. Bown, founded between 1868 and 1870
Bradshaw Gass & Hope, founded 1862
Brian Ring, Howard & Partners, founded 1958
Broadway Malyan, founded 1956
Building Design Partnership (BDP), founded 1964
Buro Happold, founded 1976
Caruso St John, founded 1990
Chamberlin, Powell and Bon, founded 1952
Chapman Taylor Architects, founded 1959
EDG:Architecture Ltd, founded 2019
EPR Architects, founded 1947
FAT (Fashion Architecture Taste) established 1990s
Farrells, founded 1965
Foster + Partners, founded 1967
Future Systems, founded 1982 and ceased operation in 2009 after Jan Kaplický's death.
Gillespie, Kidd & Coia, founded 1927, wound up 1987
Glenn Howells Architects, founded 1990
GMW Architects, founded 1948
Gregory Phillips Architects, founded 1991
Grimshaw Architects, founded 1980
GSSArchitecture, founded 1879
Habershon and Fawckner, active c.1870 - c.1891
Hackett Hall McKnight, founded in Belfast in 2008
Hampshire County Architects
Haworth Tompkins, founded 1991
Hopkins Architects, founded 1976
Hudson Architects
Information Based Architecture, founded 1998
Jestico + Whiles, founded 1977
John Robertson Architects, founded 1993
Lifschutz Davidson Sandilands, founded 1986
Loyn & Co, founded 1987
MacCormac Jamieson Prichard, founded 1972
Maccreanor Lavington, founded 1992
MacGibbon and Ross, founded 1872, wound up 1914
Mackenzie Wheeler Architects and Designers, founded 1986
Make Architects, founded 2004
Morris and Steedman, founded 1952
muf, founded 1994

N–Z

Pascall+Watson, founded 1956
Percy Thomas Partnership, founded c.1912, bought by Capita Group in 2004
Pringle Richards Sharratt, founded 1996
Proctor and Matthews Architects
Pugin & Pugin, active c.1851 to c.1928
RMJM, founded 1956
Richard Rogers Partnership, founded 1977 and renamed Rogers Stirk Harbour + Partners in 2007
Scott Brownrigg, founded 1910
Seymour Harris Partnership
Shepheard Epstein and Hunter, founded by Peter Shepheard, Gabriel Epstein and Peter Hunter
Sheppard, Robson and Partners, founded 1938
Alison and Peter Smithson
Stallan-Brand
Ushida Findlay Architects, founded in Japan in 1986, but headquartered in London
Wilkinson Eyre, founded 1983
Zaha Hadid Architects, founded 1980

See also

 List of architecture firms
 Royal Institute of British Architects

References

 
Firms, British
Architecture